Aldobrandino I of Este (c. 1190 - 10 October 1215) was the marquis of Este and Ferrara, both in Italy. He was co-ruler with his half brother Azzo VII. He was also the posthumous father of Saint Contardo of Este. His daughter Beatrice married King of Hungary, Andrew II, and became Queen of Hungary.

References

House of Este
12th-century Italian nobility
13th-century Italian nobility
1190 births
1215 deaths
Year of birth uncertain